Headlights was an American indie rock band from Champaign, Illinois  on Polyvinyl Records. The band was formed following the dissolution of Absinthe Blind, when members Seth, Erin and Brett Sanderson formed a band named Orphans. It was only when Tristan Wraight joined that Headlights was formed.

Headlights released The Enemies EP in 2004, and followed that up in 2006 with a split single with Canadian indie rock band The Most Serene Republic. Later in 2006, the band released their debut album, Kill Them with Kindness, which received generally positive reviews. Nick Sanborn (of Decibully) and John Owen (of fellow Champaign group Shipwreck) joined the group during the summer of 2007. In 2008, their third album, Some Racing, Some Stopping, was released.

In February 2008, Headlights covered the Evangelicals song Skeleton Man in a web-exclusive for Pitchfork Media.

In May 2008, several of Headlight's songs from Some Racing, Some Stopping were featured in the radio channel of the PC game Audiosurf.

Headlights were managed by Bob Andrews and Adam Klavohn at  Undertow Music Collective.

In an interview with Brett Sanderson published January 2012, Headlights was confirmed to be disbanded.

Discography
 The Enemies EP (CD/12") - Polyvinyl Record Company - 2004
 EP2 (CD-R/12") - Self-Released - 2005
 Split single with The Most Serene Republic (7") - Polyvinyl Record Company - 2005
 Kill Them with Kindness (CD/12") - Polyvinyl Record Company - 2006
 Keep Your Friends and Loves Close. Keep the City You Call Home Closer (CD) - Polyvinyl Record Company - 2007
 Some Racing, Some Stopping (CD/12") - Polyvinyl Record Company - 2008
 Remixes (CD/12") - Polyvinyl Record Company - 2008
 Wildlife (CD/12") - Polyvinyl Record Company - 2009

References

External links
 IYS 2009 Interview
 ZME Music June 16th, 2009 Interview
 Love Song For Buddy video
 Get Going video

Indie rock musical groups from Illinois
Musical groups established in 2004
Musical groups from Champaign, Illinois
Polyvinyl Record Co. artists